The Journal of Bioactive and Compatible Polymers is a bimonthly peer-reviewed scientific journal covering the field of materials science, especially the use of polymers in biomedicine. its editor-in-chief is Kathryn Uhrich (Rutgers University). The journal was established in 1986 and is published by SAGE Publications.

Abstracting and indexing 
The journal is abstracted and indexed in Scopus and the Science Citation Index Expanded. According to the Journal Citation Reports, its 2020 impact factor is 1.756, ranking it 141st out of 160 journals in the category "Biotechnology & Applied Microbiology", 37th out of 41 journals in the category "Materials Science, Biomaterials", and 69th out of 91 journals in the category "Polymer Science".

References

External links 
 

Materials science journals
Bimonthly journals
SAGE Publishing academic journals
Publications established in 1986
English-language journals